The Aspetuck Reservoir is a large body of water in Fairfield County, Connecticut.  It is formed on the Aspetuck River.
All of the Aspetuck River Watershed in Redding, the easternmost quadrant of the Town, drains south to the Aspetuck Reservoir in Easton and Fairfield.

References

Lakes of Fairfield County, Connecticut
Reservoirs in Connecticut
Protected areas of Fairfield County, Connecticut